Mentor Township is the name of some places in the U.S. state of Michigan:

 Mentor Township, Cheboygan County, Michigan
 Mentor Township, Oscoda County, Michigan

Michigan township disambiguation pages